Michaela Brezovská (born 1989, birth name Michaela Hlaváčková) is a model from Slovakia. She is a granddaughter of Slovak actor Oldo Hlaváček

Career
In 2004, Brezovská was one of the finalists in the Elite Model Look contest.

In 2006, Brezovská modeled for both Chanel and Givenchy for their haute couture Spring/Summer 2006 collection.

Brezovská has modeled for: Andrew Gn, Calvin Klein, Emanuel Ungaro, Lanvin, Marc Jacobs, Matthew Williamson, Missoni, Prada, Rochas, Stella McCartney, Victoria's Secret, and Viktor & Rolf.

In 2009, it was reported that Brezovská a problem with anorexia.

In 2012, Brezovská modeled for the ready to wear Spring/Summer 2012 collection of Alexandre Herchcovitch, Arise African Fashion Collective, DKNY, Elie Tahari, Gap, Hervé Léger by Max Azria, Jeremy Scott, L'Wren Scott, Nicole Miller, and Ruffian. Also, for the ready to wear Autumn/Winter 2012 collection, Brezovská modeled for Dennis Basso and The Row.

Brezovská is signed to Elite Model Management agency.

In 2019, she married businessman Rastislav Brezovský with whom she has a son. She has two additional sons from a previous marriage.

References

External links
 https://web.archive.org/web/20090107011858/http://www.michaelahlavackova.com/home.html

1989 births
Slovak female models
Living people
People from Bratislava